The following is a list of the causes of human deaths worldwide for different years arranged by their associated mortality rates. In 2002, there were about 57 million deaths. In 2005, according to the World Health Organization (WHO)  using the International Statistical Classification of Diseases and Related Health Problems (ICD), about 58 million people died. In 2010, according to the Institute for Health Metrics and Evaluation, 52.8 million people died. In 2016, the WHO recorded 56.7 million deaths with the leading cause of death as cardiovascular disease causing more than 17 million deaths (about 31% of the total) as shown in the chart to the side.

Some causes listed include deaths also included in more specific subordinate causes, and some causes are omitted, so the percentages may only sum approximately to 100%. The causes listed are relatively immediate medical causes, but the ultimate cause of death might be described differently.  For example, tobacco smoking often causes lung disease or cancer, and alcohol use disorder can cause liver failure or a motor vehicle accident. For statistics on preventable ultimate causes, see preventable causes of death.

Besides frequency, other measures to compare, consider and monitor trends of causes of deaths include disability-adjusted life year (DALY) and years of potential life lost (YPLL).

By frequency
Age standardized death rate, per 100,000, by cause, in 2017, and percentage change 2007–2017.

Overview table

This first table gives a convenient overview of the general categories and broad causes. The leading cause is cardiovascular disease at 31.59% of all deaths.

Developed vs. developing economies

Top causes of death, according to the World Health Organization report for the calendar year 2001:

Detailed table

This table gives a more detailed and specific breakdown of the causes for the year 2017:

By lost years

Underlying causes
Causes of death can be structured into immediate causes of death or primary causes of death, conditions leading to cause of death, underlying causes, and further relevant conditions that may have contributed to fatal outcome.

According to the WHO, underlying causes are "the disease[s] or injury[ies] which initiated the train[s] of morbid events leading directly to death, or the circumstances of the accident or violence which produced the fatal injury".

Malnutrition
Malnutrition can be identified as an underlying cause for shortened life. 70% of childhood deaths (age 0–4) are reportedly due to diarrheal illness, acute respiratory infection, malaria and immunizable disease. However 56% of these childhood deaths can be attributed to the effects of malnutrition as an underlying cause.
The effects of malnutrition include increased susceptibility to infection, musculature wasting, skeletal deformities and neurologic development delays. According to the World Health Organization, malnutrition is named as the biggest contributor to child mortality with 36 million deaths in 2005 related to malnutrition.

Obesity and unhealthy diets
Beyond undernutrition and micronutrient deficiencies, malnutrition also includes obesity, which predisposes towards several chronic diseases, including 13 different types of cancer, cardiovascular diseases, and type 2 diabetes. According to the WHO, being "chronically overweight and obesity are among the leading causes of death and disability in Europe", with estimates suggesting they cause more than 1.2 million deaths annually, corresponding to over 13% of total mortality in the region. Various types of health policy could counter the trend and reduce obesity.

Diets, not just in terms of obesity but also of food composition, can have a major impact on underlying factors , with reviews suggesting i.a. that a 20-years old male in Europe who switches to the "optimal diet" could gain a mean of ~13.7 years of life and a 60-years old female in the U.S. switching to the "optimal diet" could gain a mean of ~8.0 years of life. It found the largest gains would be made by eating more legumes, whole grains, and nuts, and less red meat and processed meat. It also contains no consumption of sugar-sweetened beverages (moving from "typical Western diet" of 500 g/day to 0 g/day).

Pollution
A review concluded that, like in 2015, pollution (¾ from air pollution) was responsible for 9 million premature deaths in 2019 (one in six deaths). It concluded that little real progress against pollution can be identified.

Air pollution
Overall, air pollution causes the deaths of around ca. 7 million people worldwide each year, and is the world's largest single environmental health risk, according to the WHO (2012) and the IEA (2016).

The IEA notes that many of root causes and cures can be found in the energy industry and suggests solutions such as retiring polluting coal-fired power plants and to establishing stricter standards for motor vehicles. In September 2020 the European Environment Agency reported that environmental factors such as air pollution and heatwaves contributed to around 13% of all human deaths in EU countries in 2012 (~630,000). A 2021 study using a high spatial resolution model and an updated concentration-response function finds that 10.2 million global excess deaths in 2012 and 8.7 million in 2018 – or  – were due to air pollution generated by fossil fuel combustion, significantly higher than earlier estimates and with spatially subdivided mortality impacts.

A 2020 study indicates that the global mean loss of life expectancy (LLE) from air pollution in 2015 was 2.9 years, substantially more than, for example, 0.3 years from all forms of direct violence, albeit a significant fraction of the LLE is considered to be unavoidable.

Uses of nervous system drugs
According to the WHO, worldwide, about 0.5 million deaths are attributable to uses of drugs, with more than 70% of these being related to opioids, with overdose being the direct cause of more than 30% of those deaths.

Various uses of various opioids accounts for many deaths worldwide, termed opioid epidemic. Nearly 75% of the 91,799 drug overdose deaths in 2020 in the United States involved an opioid.

Not all nervous system drugs are associated with risks for contributing to deaths as an underlying factor or for uses that are. In some cases, potentially harmful or harmful drugs can be substituted or weaned off with the help of pharmacological alternatives – such as potentially NAC and modafinil in the case of cocaine dependence – whose uses are not considered to be underlying causes of deaths. In some cases, they – including caffeine – can help improve general health such as, directly and indirectly, physical fitness and mental health either in general or in specific ranges of informed administrations.

Smoking
Smoking is the leading cause of preventable death in the United States. It's an underlying cause of many cancers, cardiovascular diseases, stroke, and respiratory diseases.

Smoking usually refers to smoking of tobacco products. E-cigarettes also pose large risks to health. The health impacts of tobacco-alternative products such as various herbs and the use of charcoal filters are often investigated less, with existing research suggesting only limited benefits over tobacco smoking. Some smokers may benefit from switching to a vaporizer as a harm reduction measure if they do not quit, which however also only has little robust evidence. Frequency of use is a major factor in the level of risks or permanence and extent of health impacts.

A review found smoking and second-hand smoke to be a global underlying cause of death as large as pollution, which in that analysis was the largest major underlying factor.

Alcohol
Globally, alcohol use was the seventh leading risk factor for both deaths and DALY in 2016. A review found that the "risk of all-cause mortality, and of cancers specifically, rises with increasing levels of consumption, and the level of consumption that minimises health loss is zero".

Non-optimal ambient temperatures
A study found that 9.4% of global deaths between 2000 and 2019 – ~5 million annually – can be attributed to extreme temperature with cold-related ones making up the larger share and decreasing and heat-related ones making up ~0.91 % and increasing. Incidences of heart attacks, cardiac arrests and strokes increase under such conditions.

Antimicrobial resistance
In a global assessment, scientists reported, based on medical records, that antibiotic resistance may have contributed to ~4.95 million (3.62–6.57) deaths in 2019, with 1.3 M directly attributed – the latter being more than deaths than from e.g. AIDS or Malaria, despite being project to rise substantially.

Comorbidities, general health, social factors and infectious diseases
Co-existing diseases can but don't necessarily contribute to death to various degrees in various ways.

In some cases, comorbidities can be major causes with complex underlying mechanisms, and a range of comorbidities can be present once.

Pandemics and infectious diseases or epidemics can be major underlying causes of deaths. In a small study of 26 decedents, the pandemized COVID-19 and infection-related disease were "major contributors" to patients' death. Such deaths are sometimes evaluated via excess deaths per capita – the COVID-19 pandemic deaths between Jan 1, 2020, and Dec 31, 2021 are estimated to be ~18.2 million. Research could help distinguish the proportions directly caused by COVID-19 from those caused by indirect consequences of the pandemic.

Mental health issues and related issues such as economic conditions and/or various uses of nervous system drugs can contribute to causes such as suicide or risky behavior related deaths.

Loneliness or insufficient social relationships is also a major underlying factor, which may be comparable to smoking and, according to one meta-analysis of 148 studies, "exceeds many well-known risk factors for mortality (e.g., obesity, physical inactivity)". Injuries and violence are "the leading causes of death among children, adolescents, and young adults in the US" with underlying risk factors for such including "detrimental community, family, or individual circumstances" that increase the likelihood of violence. Types of preventive measures may include support of "healthy development of individuals, families, schools, and communities, and build[ing] capacity for positive relationships and interactions".

Lifestyle factors – including physical inactivity, and tobacco smoking and excessive alcohol use , healthy eating  – and/or general health – including fitness beyond healthy diet and non-obesity – can be underlying contributors to death. For example, in a sample of U.S. adults, ~9.9% deaths of adults aged 40 to 69 years and ~7.8% adults aged 70 years or older were attributed to inadequate levels of physical activity.

Aging

Traditionally aging is not considered as a cause of death. It is believed that there is always a more direct cause, and usually it is one of many age-related diseases. It is estimated that, as a root cause, the aging process underlies 2/3 of all death in the world (approximately 100,000 people per day in 2007). In highly developed countries this proportion can reach 90%. There are requests of granting aging an official status of a disease and treating it directly (such as via dietary changes  and senolytics).

Economics and policies
Economics and policies may be factors underlying deaths at a more fundamental level. For example, economics may result in certain therapies or screenings being expensive rather than produced at an affordable price or medication costs being too high for an individual to afford them even if they are made available at low cost, poverty can affect nutrition, marketing can increase the consumption of unhealthy products, incentives and regulations for health and healthy environments may be weak or missing, and occupational safety and humans' environment can suffer due to economic pressures for low production costs and high consumption. Health policy and health systems can have impacts on deaths and thereby may also be a factor of deaths, also including for example education policy (e.g. health illiteracy), climate policy (e.g. future water scarcity impacts) and transportation policy (e.g. motor vehicle accidents, pollution and physical activity), as well as in/action on policy-influenceable physical inactivity. 'Recent financial difficulties' appears to be a factor of mortality. One study estimated how many people die from poverty in the U.S. Low socioeconomic status, as determined by economics, appears to reduce life expectancy. The current systemic incentive for maximized profits may inhibit global occupational health and safety. The negative externality of environmental damages can have substantial impacts on global healthcare.

Underlying factors by cause

Underlying factors can also be analyzed per cause of (or major contributor to) death and can be distinguished between "preventable" factors and other factors. For example, various Global Burden of Disease Studies investigate such factors and quantify recent developments – one such systematic analysis analyzed the (non)progress on cancer and its causes during the 2010-19 decade, indicating that 2019, ~44% of all cancer deaths – or ~4.5 M deaths or ~105 million lost disability-adjusted life years – were due to known clearly preventable risk factors, led by smoking, alcohol use and high BMI.

Determination and tracking of underlying factors
Improvements to this reporting, where e.g. certain diseases are often under-reported or underlying cause-of-death (COD) statement are incorrect, could ultimately improve public health. One reason for this is that from "a public health point of view, preventing this first disease or injury will result in the greatest health gain".

By age group (U.S.)

By occupation (U.S.)
With an average of 123.6 deaths per 100,000 from 2003 through 2010 the most dangerous occupation in the United States is the cell tower construction  industry.

See also

 Capital punishment by country
 Epidemiology of suicide
 List of countries by intentional homicide rate
 List of killings by law enforcement officers by country
 List of sovereign states and dependent territories by mortality rate
 List of terrorist incidents
 List of unusual deaths
 List of wars and anthropogenic disasters by death toll (with links to many by-country and by-type detail lists)
 Preventable causes of death
 Medical error

References

External links
 Deaths: Leading Causes for 2009
 Leading causes of death in the U.S. for 2015-2020

Alcohol and health

Death-related lists
Demography
Substance-related disorders